Buysky District  is an administrative and municipal district (raion), one of the twenty-four in Kostroma Oblast, Russia. It is located in the west of the oblast. Its administrative center is the town of Buy (which is not administratively a part of the district). Population:  8,847 (2002 Census);

Administrative and municipal status
Within the framework of administrative divisions, Buysky District is one of the twenty-four in the oblast. The town of Buy serves as its administrative center, despite being incorporated separately as a town of oblast significance—an administrative unit with the status equal to that of the districts.

As a municipal division, the district is incorporated as Buysky Municipal District. The town of oblast significance of Buy is incorporated separately from the district as Buy Urban Okrug.

References

Notes

Sources

Districts of Kostroma Oblast
 
